Shelly Johnson may refer to:
 Shelly Johnson (Twin Peaks), a fictional character from the television series Twin Peaks
 Shelly Johnson (cinematographer) (born c. 1960), American cinematographer
 Shelly E. Johnson (born 1985), American musician
 Shelley Johnson (kayaker), author of books about kayaking, see National Outdoor Book Award